The National Broadcasting Company (NBC) is an American broadcast television television network owned by the NBCUniversal Filmed and Entertainment division of NBCUniversal, which originated as a radio network in November 1926 and expanded into television in April 1939. The network currently has 12 owned-and-operated stations, and current affiliation agreements with 223 other television stations.

This article is a listing of current NBC affiliates in the United States and U.S. possessions (including subchannel affiliates, satellite stations and select low-power translators), arranged alphabetically by state, and based on the station's city of license and followed in parentheses by the Designated Market Area if it differs from the city of license. There are links to and articles on each of the stations, describing their histories, local programming and technical information, such as broadcast frequencies.

The station's advertised channel number follows the call letters. In most cases, this is their virtual channel (PSIP) number.

Stations listed in boldface are owned and operated by NBC through its subsidiary NBCUniversal Owned Television Stations (excluding owned-and-operated stations of Telemundo, unless the station simulcasts a co-owned NBC O&O station via a digital subchannel).

United States

Alabama
 Birmingham – WVTM-TV 13
 Dothan – WRGX-LD 23.1 / WTVY-DT4 4.4
 Huntsville – WAFF 48
 Mobile – WPMI-TV 15
 Montgomery – WSFA 12

Alaska
Some NBC programming is broadcast on the Alaska Rural Communications Service (ARCS).
 Anchorage – KTUU-TV 2.1
 Fairbanks – KTVF 11.1
 Juneau – KATH-LD 2.1
 Sitka – KSCT-LP 2.1 (satellite of KATH-LD)
 Ketchikan – KUBD 2.1 (satellite of KATH-LD)

Arizona
 Flagstaff – KNAZ-TV 2 (satellite of KPNX)
 Mesa (Phoenix) – KPNX 12
 Tucson – KVOA 4
 Yuma – KYMA-DT 11.1

Arkansas
 El Dorado (Monroe, LA) – KTVE 10
 Fort Smith – KFTA-DT2 24.2 (simulcast of KNWA-TV)
 Jonesboro – KAIT-DT2 8.2
 Little Rock – KARK-TV 4
 Rogers (Fayetteville) – KNWA-TV 51

California
 Bakersfield – KGET-TV 17
 Chico – KNVN 24
 Eureka – KIEM-TV 3
 Fresno – KSEE 24
 Los Angeles – KNBC 4
 Palm Springs – KMIR-TV 36
 Sacramento – KCRA-TV 3
 Salinas (Monterey) – KSBW 8
 San Diego – KNSD 39
 San Jose (San Francisco) – KNTV 11
 San Luis Obispo (Santa Barbara) – KSBY 6

Colorado
 Denver – KUSA 9
 Grand Junction – KKCO 11
 Pueblo (Colorado Springs) – KOAA-TV 5

Connecticut
 New Britain (Hartford) – WVIT 30

Delaware
 None; served by WCAU Philadelphia and WRDE-LD Salisbury, Maryland

District of Columbia
 Washington, D.C. – WRC-TV 4

Florida
 Daytona Beach (Orlando) – WESH 2 (ATSC 3.0 TV Station) / WKCF (ATSC 1.0 Simulcast)
 Fort Myers – WBBH-TV 20
 Gainesville – WNBW-DT 9
 Jacksonville – WTLV 12
 Miami – WTVJ 6 (ATSC 3.0 TV Station) / WSCV (ATSC 1.0 Simulcast)
 Panama City – WJHG-TV 7
 Tallahassee – WTWC-TV 40
 Tampa – WFLA-TV 8
 West Palm Beach – WPTV 5

Georgia
 Albany – WALB 10
 Atlanta – WXIA-TV 11
 Augusta – WAGT-CD 26 and WRDW-TV 12.2
 Columbus – WLTZ 38
 Macon – WMGT-TV 41
 Savannah – WSAV-TV 3

Hawaii
 Hilo – KSIX-TV 13 (satellite of KHNL)
 Honolulu – KHNL 13
 Wailuku – KOGG 13 (satellite of KHNL)

Idaho
 Boise – KTVB 7
 Pocatello (Idaho Falls) – KPVI-DT 6
 Twin Falls – KTFT-LD 7 (satellite of KTVB)

Illinois
 Chicago – WMAQ-TV 5
 Decatur (Springfield) – WAND 17
 Peoria – WEEK-TV 25
 Quincy – WGEM-TV 10
 Rockford – WREX 13

Indiana
 Evansville – WFIE 14
 Fort Wayne – WPTA-DT2 21.2
 Indianapolis – WTHR 13
 Lafayette - WPBI-LD2 16.2
 South Bend – WNDU-TV 16
 Terre Haute – WTWO 2

Iowa
 Davenport – KWQC-TV 6
 Des Moines – WHO-DT 13
 Ottumwa – KYOU-DT2 15.2
 Sioux City – KTIV 4
 Waterloo (Cedar Rapids) – KWWL 7

Kansas
 Garden City (Dodge City) – KSNG 11 (satellite of KSNW)
 Great Bend – KSNC 2 (satellite of KSNW)
 Salina – KSNL-LD 23 (satellite of KSNW)
 Topeka – KSNT 27
 Wichita – KSNW 3

Kentucky
 Bowling Green – WNKY 40
 Lexington – WLEX-TV 18
 Louisville – WAVE 3
 Paducah – WPSD-TV 6

Louisiana
 Alexandria – KALB-TV 5
 Baton Rouge – WVLA-TV 33
 Lake Charles – KPLC 7
 Lafayette - KLAF-LD 46 / KADN-DT2 15.2  
 New Orleans – WDSU 6
 Shreveport – KTAL 6

Maine
 Bangor – WLBZ 2 (satellite of WCSH)
 Fort Kent (Presque Isle) – WWPI-LD 16
 Portland – WCSH 6

Maryland
 Baltimore – WBAL-TV 11
 Salisbury - WRDE-LD 26

Massachusetts
 Springfield – WWLP 22 / WFXQ-CD 22 (repeater of WWLP)

Michigan
 Alpena – WBKB-DT2 11.2
 Cheboygan – WTOM-TV 4 (satellite of WPBN-TV)
 Detroit – WDIV-TV 4
 Grand Rapids – WOOD-TV 8
 Marquette – WLUC-TV 6
 Onondaga (Lansing) – WILX-TV 10
 Saginaw (Flint) – WEYI-TV 25
 Traverse City – WPBN-TV 7

Minnesota
 Chisholm – KRII 11 (semi-satellite of KBJR-TV, Superior, WI)
 Minneapolis – KARE 11
 Rochester – KTTC 10
 Mankato - KMNF-LD 7

Mississippi
 Grenada (Greenville) – WNBD-LD 33
 Gulfport (Biloxi) – WXXV-DT2 25.2
 Jackson – WLBT 3
 Laurel (Hattiesburg) – WDAM-TV 7
 Meridian – WGBC-DT2 30.2
 Tupelo – WTVA 9

Missouri
 Columbia – KOMU-TV 8
 Joplin – KSNF 16
 Kansas City – KSHB-TV 41
 St. Joseph – KNPG-LD 21
 St. Louis – KSDK 5
 Springfield – KYTV 3

Montana
 Billings – KULR-TV 8
 Glendive – KXGN-DT2 5.2
 Great Falls – KTGF-LD 50 (satellite of KTVH-DT)
 Helena – KTVH-DT 12
 Miles City – KYUS-TV 3 (satellite of KULR-TV)
 NBC Montana
 Bozeman – KDBZ-CD 29 (satellite of KECI-TV)
 Butte – KTVM-TV 6 (satellite of KECI-TV)
 Kalispell – KCFW-TV 9 (satellite of KECI-TV)
 Missoula – KECI-TV 13

Nebraska
 McCook – KSNK 8 (satellite of KSNW, Wichita, KS)
 North Platte – KNOP-TV 2
 Omaha – WOWT 6
 Scottsbluff - KNEP 2
 Superior (Grand Island/Lincoln) – KSNB-TV 4

Nevada
 Las Vegas – KSNV-DT 3
 Reno – KRNV-DT 4

New Hampshire
 Nashua (Boston, MA) – WBTS-CD 15

New Jersey
 None; served by WNBC New York and WCAU Philadelphia

New Mexico
 Albuquerque – KOB 4
 Farmington – KOBF 12 (satellite of KOB)
 Roswell – KOBR 8 (satellite of KOB)

New York
 Albany – WNYT 13
 Binghamton – WBGH-CD 20 / WIVT-DT2 34.2 (repeater of WBGH-CD)
 Buffalo – WGRZ 2
 Elmira – WETM-TV 18
 New York City – WNBC 4
 Plattsburgh (Burlington, Vermont) – WPTZ 5
 Rochester – WHEC-TV 10
 Syracuse – WSTM-TV 3
 Utica – WKTV 2
 Watertown - WVNC-LD 45

North Carolina
 Charlotte – WCNC-TV 36
 Raleigh – WRAL-TV 5
 Washington (Greenville) – WITN-TV 7
 Wilmington – WECT 6
 Winston-Salem (Greensboro) – WXII-TV 12

North Dakota
 Bismarck – KFYR-TV 5
 Dickinson – KQCD-TV 7
 Fargo – KVLY-TV 11
 Minot – KMOT 10
 Williston – KUMV-TV 8

Ohio
 Cincinnati – WLWT 5
 Cleveland – WKYC 3
 Columbus – WCMH-TV 4
 Dayton – WDTN 2
 Lima – WLIO 8
 Steubenville (Wheeling, West Virginia) – WTOV-TV 9
 Toledo – WNWO-TV 24
 Youngstown – WFMJ-TV 21
 Zanesville – WHIZ-TV 18

Oklahoma
 Ada (Sherman, Texas) – KTEN 10
 Oklahoma City – KFOR-TV 4
 Tulsa – KJRH-TV 2

Oregon
 Bend – KTVZ 21
 Coos Bay – KMCB 23 (repeater of KMTR)
 Eugene – KMTR 16
 Klamath Falls – KOTI 2
 Medford – KOBI 5
 Portland – KGW 8
 Roseburg – KTCW 46 (repeater of KMTR)

Pennsylvania
 Erie – WICU-TV 12
 Johnstown – WJAC-TV 6
 Lancaster (Harrisburg) – WGAL 8
 Philadelphia – WCAU 10
 Pittsburgh – WPXI 11
 Wilkes-Barre – WBRE-TV 28

Rhode Island
 Providence – WJAR 10

South Carolina
 Charleston – WCBD-TV 2
 Columbia – WIS 10
 Greenville – WYFF 4
 Myrtle Beach – WMBF-TV 32

South Dakota
 Mitchell – KDLV-TV 5 (satellite of KDLT)
 Rapid City – KNBN 21
 Sioux Falls – KDLT-TV 46

Tennessee
 Chattanooga – WRCB 3
 Jackson – WNBJ-LD 39
 Knoxville – WBIR-TV 10
 Memphis – WMC-TV 5
 Nashville – WSMV-TV 4

Texas
 Abilene – KRBC-TV 9
 Amarillo – KAMR-TV 4
 Austin – KXAN-TV 36
 Beaumont – KBMT-DT2 12.2
 Brownsville (Rio Grande Valley) – KVEO-TV 23
 Bryan – KAGS-LD 23 (semi-repeater of KCEN-TV)
 Corpus Christi – KRIS-TV 6
 El Paso – KTSM-TV 9
 Fort Worth (Dallas) – KXAS-TV 5
 Houston – KPRC-TV 2
 Jacksonville (Tyler) – KETK-TV 56
 Laredo – KGNS-TV 8
 Lubbock – KCBD 11
 Odessa (Midland) – KWES-TV 9
 San Angelo – KSAN-TV 3
 San Antonio – WOAI-TV 4
 Temple (Waco) – KCEN-TV 6
 Texarkana (Shreveport, LA) – KTAL-TV 6
 Victoria – KMOL-LD 17 | 25.2
 Wichita Falls – KFDX-TV 3

Utah
 Salt Lake City – KSL-TV 5

Vermont
 None; served by WPTZ Plattsburgh, New York, WBTS-CD Boston, Massachusetts, and WNYT Albany, New York

Virginia
 Bristol (Tri-Cities, Tennessee-Virginia) – WCYB-TV 5
 Charlottesville – WVIR-TV 29 / WVIR-CD 29
 Harrisonburg – WSVW-LD/W22EX-D 30/22 / WHSV-TV 3.2
 Portsmouth (Norfolk) – WAVY-TV 10
 Richmond – WWBT 12
 Roanoke – WSLS-TV 10

Washington
 Richland – KNDU 25 (satellite of KNDO)
 Seattle – KING-TV 5
 Spokane – KHQ-TV 6
 Yakima – KNDO 23

West Virginia
 Bluefield – WVVA 6
 Clarksburg – WBOY-TV 12
 Huntington (Charleston) – WSAZ-TV 3 (ATSC 3.0 TV Station) / WQCW (ATSC 1.0 Simulcast)
 Parkersburg – WTAP-TV 15

Wisconsin
 Eau Claire (La Crosse) – WEAU 13
 Green Bay – WGBA-TV 26
 Madison – WMTV 15
 Milwaukee – WTMJ-TV 4
 Rhinelander (Wausau) – WJFW-TV 12
 Superior (Duluth, Minnesota) – KBJR-TV 6

Wyoming
 Casper – KCWY-DT 13
 Cheyenne – KGWN-DT2 5.2 (satellite of KNEP)

NBC stations outside the United States

U.S. possessions

American Samoa
 Pago Pago - KVZK 5

Guam
 Hagåtña – KUAM-TV 8

Puerto Rico
 San Juan – WKAQ-TV 2.3 (satellite of WNBC-TV)

U.S. Virgin Islands
 Charlotte Amalie – WVGN-LD 19

Aruba
 Oranjestad – PJA-TV 15

Footnotes

See also
 List of NBC television affiliates (table)
 List of former NBC television affiliates
 Lists of ABC television affiliates
 Lists of CBS television affiliates

NBC